Perigonia grisea is a moth of the  family Sphingidae. It is known from Bolivia.

It can be distinguished from all other Perigonia species by the uniform grey forewing upperside crossed by narrow, dark brown transverse lines. The hindwing upperside is most similar to Perigonia stulta but the yellow tornal patch is larger.

Adults have been recorded from March to April.

References

Perigonia
Moths described in 1903